Powderhorn is an unincorporated community and a U.S. Post Office in Gunnison County, Colorado, United States.  The Powderhorn Post Office has the ZIP Code 81243.

History
A post office called Powderhorn was established in 1880. Some say the community was named from a nearby landform in the shape of a powderhorn, while others believe an old powderhorn found near the town site caused the name to be selected.

Geography
Powderhorn is located at  (38.276732,-107.095242).

Climate
Climate type is dominated by the winter season, a long, bitterly cold period with short, clear days, relatively little precipitation mostly in the form of snow, and low humidity.  The Köppen Climate Classification sub-type for this climate is "Dfc" (Continental Subarctic Climate).

See also

 List of municipalities in Colorado

References

External links

Unincorporated communities in Gunnison County, Colorado
Unincorporated communities in Colorado